Dhoni may refer to:

 Mahendra Singh Dhoni, a former international cricketer and captain of the India national cricket team
 M.S. Dhoni: The Untold Story, a 2016 Indian biographical film about the cricketer
 M.S. Dhoni: The Untold Story (soundtrack), soundtrack album of the film
 Dhoni (film), a 2012 Indian film by Prakash Raj
 Dhoni (fishing vessel) – traditional sailing boat found in the Maldives, South India and Sri Lanka
Dhoni, Palakkad, a village in India
Radio Dhoni, a Bangladeshi FM radio station